The Tisa is a river in Central Europe.

Tisa, TISA, tisa, or variants, may also refer to:

Places
 Tisá, a village in the Czech Republic
 Tisa, Hooghly, West Bengal, India
 Tisa, a village in Hălmagiu Commune, Arad County, Romania
 Tisa, a village in Sănduleni Commune, Bacău County, Romania
 Tisa, a village in Burjuc Commune, Hunedoara County, Romania
 Tisa, a village in Bocicoiu Mare Commune, Maramureș County, Romania
 Tisa, a village in Sângeru Commune, Prahova County, Romania
 Tisa, a village in Băile Olănești town, Vâlcea County, Romania
 Tisa Nouă, a village in Fântânele Commune, Arad County, Romania

Rivers
 Tisa, a tributary of the Bâsculița in Buzău County, Romania
 Tisa, a tributary of the Cracăul Negru in Neamț County, Romania
 Tisa, a tributary of the Lemnia in Covasna County, Romania
 Tisa, a tributary of the Lotrioara in Sibiu County, Romania
 Tisa, a tributary of the Otăsău in Vâlcea County, Romania
 Tisa, a tributary of the Râul Mic in Alba County, Romania

Other
 International School of Azerbaijan, an international school in Baku, Azerbaijan
 Taishanese (ISO 639-6 code: tisa) aka Toisanese, Hoisanese; a dialect of Cantonese
 The Indian Stammering Association, a non-profit organization based in India, working in the field of stuttering
 Trade in Services Agreement, a proposed international trade treaty
 Traveller Information Services Association, an organization concerned with the Traffic Message Channel used by motor vehicle drivers
 Truth in Savings Act, a United States federal law